Allodiplophryxus is a genus of Isopoda parasites, in the family Bopyridae, containing the following species that is distributed all over the Gulf of Mexico:
Allodiplophryxus floridanus Markham, 1985

References 

Cymothoida